The Puerto Rican slider (Trachemys stejnegeri stejnegeri) is a subspecies of turtle found mainly in Puerto Rico and surrounding areas. It is a relative of the pond slider.

References 

Bibliography

Trachemys